Kilometer 31  (Kilómetro 31 or km 31)  is a 2006 Mexican supernatural horror film, written and directed by Rigoberto Castañeda. The film is inspired by the Crying Woman legend (La Llorona) and legends about highway ghosts.

Plot 

Following a horrible car accident on a rural wooded road near Mexico City, Agata goes into a coma, and her identical twin sister Catalina begins to experience the pain and terror that her comatose sister is going through. Catalina must try to solve the mystery of her sister's accident next to the Km. 31 marker and discovers a local legend that tells of malignant spirits that prowl the road and who are said to prey on travellers. Following a series of terrifying events, Catalina realizes that their link is growing stronger and that her sister is screaming for help from her unconscious state. With the help of her Spanish boyfriend Nuño, Agata's boyfriend Omar, and local detective Martin Ugalde, she discovers that Agata is trapped between life and death, between reality and a terrible netherworld of evil spirits and ancient legend.

Reception 

The film was released on February 2 and was on top in the Mexican box office that weekend. 

The film was released in select cinemas in the United Kingdom, with English subtitles, on December 7, 2007 after its premiere at the Empire Cinema in Leicester Square on 6 November 2007.

A sequel was released in 2016.

See also
List of ghost films

References

External links 
 

2006 films
2006 horror films
Films based on folklore
Mexican supernatural horror films
Folk horror films
Films set in Mexico City
Films set in Mexico
Mexican ghost films
La Llorona
2000s Mexican films